Louis Sekora (born November 4, 1931) is a Canadian politician.

Born in Hafford, Saskatchewan, Sekora served as mayor of Coquitlam, British Columbia, from 1983 to 1997. He was first elected to city council in 1972. A series of acting mayors replaced him, eventually followed by Jon Kingsbury who served from 1998 to 2005.

Sekora resigned to run in a 1998 by-election and was elected to the House of Commons of Canada as a candidate of the Liberal Party of Canada, representing the riding of Port Moody—Coquitlam. In the 2000 general election, he lost his seat to Canadian Alliance candidate James Moore.

Following his loss, he was appointed as a part-time Citizenship Judge by Prime Minister Jean Chrétien.

In 2005, he was elected back to the Coquitlam City Council as an independent.

In 2014, he ran for Mayor of Coquitlam again, but was defeated by incumbent Richard Stewart.

References

External links

1931 births
Living people
Members of the House of Commons of Canada from British Columbia
Liberal Party of Canada MPs
Coquitlam city councillors
Canadian citizenship judges
Mayors of places in British Columbia